Thomas William Hamilton (born December 31, 1951) is an American musician and songwriter who serves as the bassist for the hard rock band Aerosmith. 

Hamilton has regularly co-written songs for Aerosmith, including two of the band's biggest successes: "Sweet Emotion" (1975) and  "Janie's Got a Gun" (1989). Hamilton occasionally plays guitar (e.g. "Uncle Salty", "Sick as a Dog"), sings backing vocals (e.g. "Love in an Elevator") and on rare occasions, lead vocals ("Up On the Mountain").  He was a 2001 inductee in the Rock and Roll Hall of Fame as a member of Aerosmith.

Early years
Thomas William Hamilton was born to George and Betty Hamilton in Colorado Springs, Colorado, who now live in Vero Beach, Florida. He has an older brother named Scott, an older sister named Perry, and a younger sister named Cecily. His father was in the United States Air Force and his mother was a housewife.

He first learned to play guitar from his brother, who received his first guitar when Tom was four years old. Hamilton first started playing guitar when his older brother Scott taught him his first chords at age 12. Tom switched to bass when he was 14 to join a local band because they had an open space at that position. Hamilton was in a few bands with soon-to-be Aerosmith guitarist Joe Perry and David "Pudge" Scott. One of the bands was simply called "The Jam Band" in 1968. It was at a Jam Band gig in summer 1970 at a place called "The Barn" in Sunapee, New Hampshire, that the Jam Band met Steven Tyler, and the four of them agreed to move to Boston to start a band (not yet named Aerosmith). Scott left the group shortly thereafter, being replaced by Tyler on drums. The three became a power trio with Hamilton on bass, Perry on guitar, and Tyler on drums and vocals. Then Ray Tabano joined and eventually Joey Kramer joined (who coined the name "Aerosmith") in replacing Tyler on drums so he could focus on vocals. Tabano was replaced by Brad Whitford and Aerosmith was born.

Personal life

According to the band's official website, Hamilton's favorite song by the band is "The Farm" (from the 1997 album Nine Lives). He married Terry Cohen in 1975 and they have two children, Julian and Sage.

In August 2006, he announced that he was diagnosed with throat and tongue cancer and completed a seven-week course of radiation and chemotherapy.  As a result, he missed Aerosmith's Route of All Evil Tour. David Hull (who played in the Joe Perry Project) filled in. Prior to this, Hamilton had never missed an Aerosmith show. He sat in with the band on "Sweet Emotion" at their September 2006 Boston show and played an entire performance at a private show at the Beacon Theatre in New York, on December 3, 2006. On December 20, 2006, Hamilton reported on Aero Force One that he is cancer-free after a recent PET scan. He underwent further surgery, causing him to sit out some of the Aerosmith/ZZ Top Tour. David Hull covered for him again during his absence. His cancer returned in 2011, but he is now cancer-free.

Hamilton left the band's April 2013 Australian tour after two shows due to a chest infection. David Hull was flown in from the US to fill in.

In April 2016, Thin Lizzy announced that Hamilton was joining them for their 2016 and 2017 reunion shows.

Hamilton's favorite bassists are John Paul Jones, John Entwistle and Paul McCartney.

Aerosmith songs written
The following Aerosmith songs have a writing credit given to Tom Hamilton
 "Sweet Emotion" from Toys in the Attic
 "Uncle Salty" from Toys in the Attic
 "Sick as a Dog" from Rocks
 "Critical Mass" from Draw the Line
 "Kings and Queens" from Draw the Line
 "The Hand That Feeds" from Draw the Line
 "The Reason a Dog" from Done with Mirrors
 "The Hop" from Done with Mirrors
 "Janie's Got a Gun" from Pump
 "The Movie" from Permanent Vacation
 "Krawhitham" from Pandora's Box
 "Beautiful" from Music From Another Dimension!
 "Tell Me" from Music From Another Dimension!
 "Lover Alot" from Music From Another Dimension!
 "Can't Stop Lovin' You" from Music From Another Dimension!
 "Up on the Mountain" from Music From Another Dimension! (Deluxe Version) [Also provides lead vocals]

Awards
2007 – Boston Music Award – Personal Achievement

Instruments 

Hamilton has used a wide variety of basses over Aerosmith's career. He has stated in several interviews that his first bass was a Fender Precision that he borrowed and later bought from a friend. He would use a Fender Precision Bass in the early years of Aerosmith, and used one to record the bass lines for their first two albums.

Since 2000, Tom Hamilton has primarily played G&L basses. He purchased his first metal-flake G&L ASAT Bass around that time at 48th Street Guitars in New York City. He now has his own G&L ASAT Bass signature model line, which is made from a special reduced-weight Western Sugar Pine body. It also comes with specially developed "Hamiltone" pickups and is available for sale in three different metal-flake colors. Tom says that he enjoys playing his G&L basses as they are an evolution of the Fender Jazz Bass sound and feel.

During the mid 1970’s Tom Hamilton frequently used a Fender Jazz Bass. Tom has said that he enjoys their unique sound as well as the feel of the slender Jazz Bass neck. He owns a stacked-knob early 1960's Fender Jazz Bass which was used to record the bass lines for "Sweet Emotion" and "Walk This Way." It was also used to record the rest of Toys in the Attic and the album Rocks. Though he rarely tours with a Jazz Bass anymore, band mate Steven Tyler surprised Hamilton with a custom-shop Fender Jazz Bass while the two were at a music store in Vancouver, Canada in 2011. This bass was used to record most of the songs on Music From Another Dimension!, and Tom can be seen playing this bass in clips where the band was working on the album.

Tom Hamilton was one of the earliest and largest players of the Music Man StingRay Bass. He first used a StingRay Bass to record the album Draw the Line in 1977. Since then, he used a StingRay Bass to record the albums Permanent Vacation, Pump, Nine Lives, and some of Just Push Play. He even used a StingRay to record the demo tracks for Get a Grip, before switching to an F Bass. Tom toured with StingRay basses throughout the late 1970s, but has only toured with them occasionally since. However, he has been seen with both four and five string StingRay models on the 2022 leg of the "Deuces Are Wild" Tour. In an interview, Tom Hamilton noted that he was very proud of the tone he got from his early model StingRay Bass on the Pump album.

In the 1970s, 1980s, and early 1990s, Tom can be seen playing a Gibson Thunderbird Bass on tour.

On the album Night in the Ruts, Tom Hamilton used a Music Man Sabre Bass to record his bass lines. He can be seen playing one in the music videos for "No Surprize" and "Chiquita."

Tom Hamilton would return to using a Fender Precision Bass on the Rock in a Hard Place and Done With Mirrors albums. He can be seen playing one in the music video for "Lightning Strikes."

For the Get a Grip album, Tom Hamilton recorded all of his bass lines with an F Bass, which he bought during the album sessions in 1992.

During the "Dude Looks Like A Lady" sequence of Wayne's World 2, he is seen playing a Gibson Les Paul Bass. Tom occasionally used this bass on the 1993-94 Get a Grip Tour.

Tom has also used a Höfner Violin Bass to record some of the Just Push Play album, but most notably he used one to record the songs What It Takes and Jaded.  During the Just Push Play sessions, he also used a double bass. 

Tom Hamilton also frequently plays Sadowsky basses. Tom Hamilton has said that Roger Sadowsky makes "unbelievably nice basses."  For the recording of the album Honkin' On Bobo and subsequent tours, he used a butterscotch Sadowsky '51 Fender Precision Bass replica modified with a second pickup. This bass has been one of his main basses for quite some time, and he appeared as playing this bass in Guitar Hero: Aerosmith. Additionally, he used a five-string Sadowsky to record the song "Pink". As of June 2009 he was touring with five Sadowsky basses, including some 5-string versions.

It is known that he also uses Parker Guitars basses. Tom was gifted one of the only prototype Parker Fly basses in 2002-2003, which he donated to VH1's Save the Music charity; which raised funds for schools with poor music programs. Tom had frequently played the bass for six months prior on tour, and it was signed by all five members of Aerosmith as well as the manufacturer. He was also gifted the first production Parker Fly Bass in April 2003. He frequently played a red Parker bass on the 2004 Honkin' On Bobo Tour.

He discusses his signature basses in rig rundowns most notably in 2012 on the Global Warming Tour.

References

External links

Aerosmith.com
Tom Hamilton's letter to the fans about his cancer and the tour
Hamilton's back in the saddle again
Hamilton treated for throat cancer
Tom Hamilton on The Emily Rooney Show on WGBH Radio
Tom Hamilton Signature ASAT Bass

1951 births
Aerosmith members
American rock musicians
Living people
American rock bass guitarists
American heavy metal bass guitarists
American male bass guitarists
Musicians from Colorado Springs, Colorado
Guitarists from Colorado
20th-century American bass guitarists
Glam metal musicians
Blues rock musicians